Asturias F.C. (currently Centro Asturiano de México) was a sports club located in Mexico City, established in 1918. The squad played in the Liga Mexicana de Football Amateur Association, the first and main league prior to the professionalisation and development of the Primera División de México in 1943.

Asturias would overcome Real Club España, club along which were known as the "foreign legion (Legión extranjera)" in the 1943–44 season after finishing with a similar record. The first final in the Mexican professional league was won by Asturias after beating R.C. España by 4–1 and thus becoming the first champion in the professional era. The club was managed by Ernesto Pauler.

Besides having the honour of being the first champion in the professional league, Asturias also holds the record for most Copa Mexico wins with 8.

History
The club was established as "Club Asturias" on 7 February 1918 when a group of Asturian immigrants made up by José Menéndez Aleu, Ángel H. Díaz and Antonio Martínez got together and decided to establish a football club that would represent their Asturian heritage.

The main goal was to unite all the Spaniards who had emigrated from Asturias to Mexico, and so imitatively the club enrolled into the Primera Fuerza but the league would only admit the club if they beat Germania, América and Tigres. They managed to beat Germania by 3–0, Tigres by 1–0 but only drew 3–3 against América, so the club would not be allowed to join the league. The club decided to form its own league calling it "Unión Nacional de Association Foot-Ball". The league would be played in the Campo Asturias which was constructed in the Paseo de la Reforma of Mexico City. The league would not charge any fee to watch the games, which encouraged locals to attend this league and not the Primera Fuerza. With this problem in hand the Primera Fuerza changed its mind and allowed the club to take part in the upcoming 1919 tournament. In 1920 the club hired Scottish former player Gerald Brown and the club managed to wins its first tournament by winning the 1920 Copa Covadonga. In 1921 the club changed its name to "Sección Deportiva del Centro Asturiano".

This club would go on to win important cups like the Copa Centenario in 1921. The club would also win the most Copa Mexico in its history before being dissolved in 1996 winning a total of eight, one more than Necaxa. This club also had the honour of being the first champion in the professional era after financing the 1943–44 tournament tied with Real Club España, where a decisive game had to play in the Asturias Park where the club defeated Real Club España 4–1.

The club would go on to play a few more years in the league, finishing no better than fifth until after the 1949–50 tournament along with Real Club España and Moctezuma de Orizaba retired from the league due to differences with the Federation. Necaxa (México), an old Primera Fuerza member who didn't accept professionalism in 1943, re-joined to fill the vacant place.

Primera Fuerza campaigns
These are all the Statistics from the club's participation in the Primera Fuerza from 1919–1943 except for the 1921–22 and the 1930–31 tournament which was not held, also the 1934–35 which is missing.

After the 1942–43 tournament the league became professional and changed its name to the Liga Mayor.

Primera División de México

After this season, Asturias, Real Club España and Moctezuma de Orizaba retired from the league due to differences with the Federation. Necaxa (México), an old Primera Fuerza member which didn't accept professionalism in 1943, re-joined for next season.

Honours
 Liga Mexicana de Football Amateur (2): 1922–23, 1938–39
 Copa México (8): 1921–22, 1922–23, 1923–24, 1933–34, 1936–37, 1938–39, 1939–40, 1940–41
 Primera División (1): 1943–44

Goal Scorer Title
 Roberto Aballay (1944–45), (40 goals)

See also
 Centro Asturiano de México
 Asturians

References

External links
Official website

Association football clubs established in 1918
Football clubs in Mexico City
1918 establishments in Mexico
Asturian diaspora
1950 disestablishments in Mexico
Association football clubs disestablished in 1950
Diaspora sports clubs
Primera Fuerza teams
Spanish-Mexican culture